Merdja Sidi Abed is a town and commune in Relizane Province, Algeria.

References

Communes of Relizane Province
Algeria
Cities in Algeria